Melaleuca suberosa, commonly known as corky-bark honey-myrtle or corky honeymyrtle, is a shrub in the myrtle family, Myrtaceae, and is endemic to the south of Western Australia. It is a distinctive shrub, recognised by its tiny, crowded leaves, corky bark and pink flowers that appear along lengths of leafless parts of the branches.

Description
Its branches and leaves are glabrous except when very young.

The flowers are a shade of deep pink to purple and are arranged on the sides of older branches and partly buried in them so that only the petals, style and stamens appear above the wood. The stamens are arranged in five bundles around the flowers and each bundle contains 9 to 15 stamens.

Taxonomy
Calothamnus suberosa was first formally described in 1844 by Johannes Conrad Schauer in Plantae Preissianae. It was placed in the present genus as Melaleuca suberosa in 1931 by Charles Austin Gardner in  Enumeratio Plantarum Australiae Occidentalis. The specific epithet (suberosa) is a Latin word meaning "corky" referring to the corky bark of this species.

Distribution and habitat
Melaleuca suberosa occurs between the Albany district and the Cocklebiddy district in the Esperance Plains, Jarrah Forest and Mallee biogeographic regions. It grows in sandy, stony or gravelly soils on plains, swampy flats and low ridges.

Conservation
This species is classified as "not threatened" by the Government of Western Australia Department of Parks and Wildlife.

Use in horticulture
Melaleuca suberosa is hardy in southern parts of Australia, preferring a sunny situation. It is frost hardy and tolerates a range of soils but is difficult to grow in tropical or sub-tropical climates.

References

suberosa
Plants described in 1944
Endemic flora of Western Australia
Taxa named by Johannes Conrad Schauer